Panayotov is a surname. Notable people with the surname include:

Aleksandr Panayotov (born 1984), Ukrainian singer-songwriter
Aleksandr Panayotov Aleksandrov (born 1951), Bulgarian cosmonaut
Georgi Velikov Panayotov (born 1968), Bulgarian diplomat
Panayot Panayotov (1930–1996), Bulgarian footballer
Plamen Panayotov (born 1958), Bulgarian politician and academic
Rumen Panayotov (born 1954), Bulgarian wheelchair curler
Vasil Panayotov (born 1990), Bulgarian footballer
Vladko Panayotov (born 1950), Bulgarian politician

Bulgarian-language surnames